The Pacific War lasted from 1941 to 1945, with the Empire of Japan fighting against the United States, the British Empire and their allies. Most of the campaign was fought on a variety of small islands in the Pacific region. Compared to the Western-European Theater, combat in the Pacific was brutal, marked by illness, disease, and ferocity. The Imperial Japanese Army (IJA) typically fought alone in these engagements, often with very little naval or aerial support, and the IJA quickly garnered a reputation for their unrelenting spirit.

At the beginning of the Pacific War in 1941, the Imperial Japanese Army contained 51 divisions, 27 of which were stationed in China. A further 13 divisions defended the Manchurian–Soviet border, due to concerns about a possible attack by the Soviet Union. From 1942, troops were sent to Hong Kong (23rd Army), the Philippines (14th Army), Thailand (15th Army), Burma (15th Army), the Dutch East Indies (16th Army), and Malaya (25th Army). A total of 5.473 million men served in the Imperial Japanese Army.

Japanese troops suffered from a shortage of supplies, especially food, medicine, munitions, and armaments, largely due to submarine interdiction of supplies, and losses to Japanese shipping, which was worsened by a longstanding rivalry with the Imperial Japanese Navy. As many as two-thirds of Japan's total military deaths were a result of illness or starvation.

Size
In Imperial Japan, all able-bodied men aged 17 to 40 were drafted for three years. In March 1945, the number was raised, allowing men aged 17 to 60, and women aged 17 to 40, totalling around 18 to 20 million people. This force was intended to defend the Japanese mainland in case of invasion, but due to Japan's surrender in August that year, it was never properly mobilized.

Overarching goals

Japanese grand strategy involved expanding its borders to help deal with Japan's lack of economic self-sufficiency, which was exacerbated by its lack of natural resources. Similar to the German concept of lebensraum, and the Italian concept of spazio vitale, the Japanese perceived the conquest of Asia and Oceania as their right. The invasions were also motivated by Pan-Asianism, and a desire to remove American and European influence on the continent. Furthermore, in response to the Great Depression, the United States passed the Smoot–Hawley Tariff Act, greatly increasing the price of exports, which Japan was reliant on. This furthered the Japanese idea that they needed to be able to survive economically without the help of other nations, prompting the invasion of Manchuria the following year.

After the Attack on Pearl Harbor and the invasion of Malaya in December 1941, the Empire of Japan was officially at war with the United States and the British Empire. Japan recognised that they would not be able to win a protracted war with the Allied Powers, and suggested that such operations should take no longer than 150 days. They were expecting that Germany would be able to force a British surrender, and subsequently, America would end the war on terms agreeable to Japanese interests.

First offensive maneuvers (1941–1942)
Once the Pacific War began, the Imperial Japanese Army quickly captured many critical areas. These included British Malaya, Guam, the Philippines and Wake Island. A combination of Japanese naval supremacy and the Allied doctrine of 'Europe first' meant they saw relatively little opposition during this stage of the war – 85% of American resources, and 68% of Army personnel went towards the European Theater. The Japanese control of a large part of Oceania and Asia gave them a strong initiative, as they were able to acquire many valuable resources, including rubber, tin, bauxite and oil – Japan had no domestic sources of oil, but in 1942 the Dutch East Indies was the fourth largest global producer of oil.

Loss of momentum
Throughout late 1942 and early 1943, the Japanese offensive in New Guinea lost momentum with losses to Australian and US forces at Milne Bay, along the Kokoda Track and around Buna–Gona. The most significant loss for the Imperial Japanese Army was the Battle of Guadalcanal, the first American counteroffensive of the war, in which the Japanese lost over 25,000 men, and, after the capture of the island, Guadalcanal became one of the largest naval and air bases in the region. The battle was the first major Allied victory on land in the Pacific Theater, and Guadalcanal would later be used as the point from which the United States Marines would attack the Palau Islands, Bougainville, and Guam. 

After Guadalcanal, the Japanese were almost entirely on the defensive. Slowly, the American forces begin their island hopping campaign and a combination of unrestricted submarine warfare and air raids on Japan destroyed Japan's industrial capabilities, which they had very little defense against. Japan's industrial capacity was equivalent to only 10% of that of the United States. Vice Admiral Raizō Tanaka remarked "There is no question that Japan's doom was sealed with the closing of the struggle for Guadalcanal."

In the island hopping campaign, American forces would capture islands that they deemed strategically essential, and blockade those deemed unimportant, to prevent Japanese troops from being resupplied or using the islands to launch an offensive, such as with the island of New Britain, where 69,000 Japanese soldiers and 20,000 civilian workers were trapped around Rabaul for two years. The island hopping strategy's effectiveness came from the fact that it was able to perform significant results despite the limited resources allocated to the Pacific theater, and that the Japanese were not able to improve their defense of the islands, most of which were garrisoned with less than a single division, because so many of their troops were dedicated to the China Burma India Theater. As such, the Allies were able to quickly acquire naval and aerial supremacy, which was imperative to the capture of further islands. Towards the end of the war, the Japanese defence became more fierce, such as in Iwo Jima and Okinawa, the two islands closest to the Japanese mainland. The Battle of Peleliu had the highest casualty rate of any American amphibious invasion at 40%, but they were still able to secure the island. 

After the capture of Okinawa, an invasion of the Japanese mainland was planned, codenamed Operation Downfall, the first stage of which would have been the invasion of Kyūshū island in November 1945. Due to the atomic bombings of Hiroshima and Nagasaki, Japan surrendered on 2 September 1945, bringing the Second World War to a close.

Equipment

Japan's service rifle was the Type 38 rifle, a 5-round bolt-action rifle firing the 6.5×50mmSR Arisaka cartridge, which had been adopted prior to the Second Sino-Japanese War. However, its round was found to be lacking in power, and it was replaced by the Type 99 rifle, which used the 7.7×58mm Arisaka, giving it ballistic performance more comparable to rifle cartridges used by other countries, such as the American .30-06 or British .303. Both rifles were used until the end of the war.
 
The most common machine guns used were the Type 96 and Type 99 light machine gun, firing the 6.5mm and 7.7mm round, respectively. They fired from 30-round magazines, loaded from the top, and though these weapons externally resemble the British Bren gun, and are sometimes believed to be copies, they are functionally and internally separate. These machine guns have a much higher rate of fire than the Bren, resulting in stoppages. To prevent this, the ammunition had to be oiled before use, and special reduced-charge rounds were issued to machine gun crews. Unusually for a machine gun, these weapons could be fitted with a bayonet. Japan also used two heavy machine guns, the Type 3 and Type 92, both of which fired from a 30-round feed tray. Both weapons were derived from the World War I-era Hotchkiss Mle 1914 machine gun, and were considerably outdated by the 1930s, but was never properly phased out due to wartime scarcity. 

The only submachine gun in service in the Japanese Empire was the Type 100. It fired the 8x22mm Nambu round, which had only half the muzzle velocity of the 9×19mm Parabellum used by Britain and Germany. The Type 100 was modelled after the German MP-18, and only a few thousand were built, compared to 1.75 million Thompsons, the SMG in use in the United States.
A weapon somewhat unique to the Imperial Japanese Army is the Type 89 grenade discharger, sometimes referred to as the knee mortar (a misnomer, as it is not fired from the knee), a man-portable mortar, that could also be used in direct fire. Three Type 89's were issued per platoon, making it the IJA's most widely used infantry support weapon. 

Japanese armor was also lacking. During the interwar period, Japan bought various Vickers 6-Tons, and largely modelled their own tank designs after them, but the effectiveness of such tanks was very limited. Japanese tanks were mostly used for reconnaissance and supply purposes as they were ineffective in direct combat against other tanks. Neither the light Type 95 Ha-Go nor the medium Type 97 Chi-Ha could penetrate an M4 Sherman frontally. Furthermore, while the United States Marines deployed twelve M3 half-tracks per battalion, while these vehicles were originally designed as tank destroyers, in the Pacific they were predominantly used as artillery, since Japanese tanks were so infrequently encountered. American light tanks such as the M5 Stuart and medium M3 Lee, while considered inadequate in Europe, were deployed in the Pacific, as they were sufficient in dealing with the Japanese.

Tactics
In Imperial Japan's military culture, heavy emphasis was put onto unrelenting spirit ('seishin'). Tactical doctrine relied on unrelenting attack and surprise, to such an extent that the word 'retreat' was de facto banned. Instead, it was called a repositioning, or a transfer.
The IJA was built on bushido, the moral code of the samurai in which honor surmounted all else, which is why so exceptionally few Japanese soldiers willingly surrendered – during the Battle of Kwajalein, of the 5,000 Japanese men on the island, 4,300 were killed, and only 166 were captured. If a force was in danger of being overwhelmed, it would not be unusual for a commander to issue a banzai charge, in which the Japanese would charge their enemy with bayonets, whilst shouting ""Tennōheika Banzai" (天皇陛下万歳), meaning "Long live His Majesty the Emperor." Towards the end of the war, banzai charges became less frequent due to their ineffectiveness, as the Marines had sufficient firepower and training to deal with them. During the Battle of Iwo Jima, General Tadamichi Kuribayashi prohibited banzai charges, as he believed they were a waste of manpower. However, some have contended he led a final banzai charge at the end of the battle.American propaganda distributed through leaflet drops accounted for about 20% of surrenders, equating to about one POW for every 6,000 leaflets dropped. Most Japanese objected to the "unscrupulous" leaflets, which claimed that American forces would be willing to accept surrenders from the Japanese. These suicides were motivated by a combination of bushido, which was enforced through propaganda, as well as reports that American soldiers would mutilate dead Japanese, sometimes taking their teeth and skulls as war trophies.

Fanaticism and war crimes

Throughout the Second Sino-Japanese War and World War II, the Imperial Japanese Army had gained a reputation both for its fanaticism and for its brutality against prisoners of war and civilians alike, of which the Nanking Massacre is the most well known example. After Japan's surrender, many Imperial Japanese Army officers and enlisted men were tried for committing numerous atrocities and war crimes in the International Military Tribunal for the Far East. The trials ceased in 1949, with a total of 5,700 cases having been heard.

One major reason that the IJA exhibited such brutality towards foreign civilians, prisoners of war, and soldiers stemmed from the fact that Japanese soldiers were treated equally harshly in training. Japanese recruits would be beaten, given unnecessarily strenuous duty tasks, insufficient food, and other violent or harsh disciplinary tactics, and so Japanese soldiers were simply reciprocating the behavior they had experienced themselves. Furthermore, recruits were told to always follow their orders, as if they were given by the Emperor himself. Senior Japanese officers, provoked by ideas of jingoism and racial animosity, believed it was only fair to abuse Americans and Europeans, the same way they believed Japan had been abused economically during the interwar period and Meiji Restoration.

See also 

 Imperial Japanese Navy in World War II
 Manchukuo Imperial Army

References

 
Military history of Japan during World War II